is the general manager of the Nagasaki Velca in the Japanese B.League. Ito is the former head coach of the Alvark Tokyo and the Nagsaki Velca.

Head coaching record

|- 
| style="text-align:left;"|Toyota Alvark
| style="text-align:left;"|2015-16
| 55||47||8|||| style="text-align:center;"|1st|||4||2||2||
| style="text-align:center;"|3rd
|- 
| style="text-align:left;"|Alvark Tokyo
| style="text-align:left;"|2016-17
| 60||44||16|||| style="text-align:center;"|2nd in Eastern|||5||3||2||
| style="text-align:center;"|Lost in 2nd round
|-

References

1982 births
Living people
Alvark Tokyo coaches
Japanese basketball coaches